Yarrabilba is a locality in the City of Logan, Queensland, Australia.

Geography
As of June 2018, Yarrabilba consists of seven neighbourhoods; The Avenues, Oak Leaf, The Retreat, Sandstone Ridge, Sunrise Crossing, Vista, and Wickham Rise (under construction).

The Darlington Parklands are located between the Oak Leaf and Vista neighbourhoods on the corner of Darlington Drive and Yarrabilba Drive.

History
Before European settlement, which began around 1862, the land was occupied by the Wangerriburra Clan of the Yugambeh language group. The name Yarrabilba comes from the Wangerriburra/Bundjalung language for place of song. The area contained two bora rings where ceremonies involving singing took place.

The Beaudesert railway line passing through the area to Canungra operated from 1915 to 1955.

During World War II the military training base Camp Cable was built between Logan Village and Tamborine, and included much of the land now part of Yarrabilba.

Formerly in the Shire of Beaudesert, Yarrabilba became part of Logan City following the local government amalgamations in March 2008.

In 2010, it was announced that Yarrabilba would be the location for a future city which is expected to contain 20,000 dwellings housing up to 50,000 people. Two other new urban centres were to be established at Greater Flagstone also in Logan City and Ecco Ripley in the City of Ipswich.

In 2011, development began for the new urban precinct.  Lend-Lease was granted approval for the development of the first  stage of the project.

On 28 November 2014, a portion of Yarrabilba was excised to create a new locality, Kairabah.

St Clare's Catholic Primary School opened in 2017.

Yarrabilba State School opened on 1 January 2018.

Yarrabilba State Secondary College opened on 1 January 2020.

San Damiano College opened in 2021, initially offering Year 7 schooling.

Education 

Yarrabilba State School is a government primary school (Prep to Year 6) for boys and girls at 1 Darnell Street. It includes a special education program. In 2018, the school had an enrolment of 470 students with 35 teachers (34 full-time equivalent) and 21 non-teaching staff (16 full-time equivalent). In February 2020, it had an enrolment of approximately 850 students.

St Clare's Primary School is a Catholic primary (Prep-6) school for boys and girls at 2 Combs Street. In 2017, the school had an enrolment of 120 students with 12 teachers (11 full-time equivalent) and 11 non-teaching staff (6 full-time equivalent). In 2018, the school had an enrolment of 166 students with 19 teachers (16 full-time equivalent) and 15 non-teaching staff (10 full-time equivalent).

Yarrabilba State Secondary College is a government secondary (Years 7-12) school for boys and girls at 22-60 McKinnon Drive. At the end of 2020 (its first year of operation with only Year 7-8 students), it had an enrolment of 277 students.

San Damiano College is a Catholic secondary (Years 7-12) school for boys and girls at 980-1040 Yarrabilba Drive.

References

1862 establishments in Australia
Planned residential developments
Queensland in World War II
Localities in Queensland